The Yang Guang Qing School of Beijing, abbreviated to YGQ, is an independent international high school in Beijing, China. 

YGQ follows the high school curriculum of Manitoba, Canada to around 130 full-time students who board on site. It is accredited by the Ministry of Education in Manitoba and has a partnership with the Great Lakes College of Toronto. The school teaches a number of subjects, including social studies, humanities, English, maths, science, IT, fine and performing arts, physical education and health.

References

Private schools in Beijing
International schools in Beijing
High schools in Beijing
Canadian international schools in China
Buildings and structures in Daxing District
1999 establishments in China
Educational institutions established in 1999